Good Hope Township is the name of some places in the U.S. state of Minnesota:
Good Hope Township, Itasca County, Minnesota
Good Hope Township, Norman County, Minnesota

Minnesota township disambiguation pages